Abani Mohan Joardar (died on 12 June 2020) was an Indian Politician from the state of West Bengal. Joardar was
a two term member of the West Bengal Legislative Assembly and represented the Krishnanagar Uttar (Vidhan Sabha constituency). Joardar was from the All India Trinamool Congress

References 

West Bengal MLAs 2011–2016
West Bengal MLAs 2016–2021
2020 deaths
Trinamool Congress politicians from West Bengal
Year of birth missing